John Billy San Luis Mamaril (born June 25, 1980) is a Filipino-American former professional basketball player who last played for the San Miguel Beermen of the Philippine Basketball Association (PBA). He plays the forward and center positions. Like his father, former PBA player and Barangay Ginebra Kings slotman Romy "Mama" Mamaril, he is known for his physical and rugged defense. He played 17 seasons in the Philippine Basketball Association.

Career
Mamaril is a shotblock artist and a good lowpost operator. During his tenure with the Purefoods TJ Hotdogs, the defunct Shell Turbo Chargers, and the Coca-Cola Tigers, he contributed solid numbers and quality minutes. He was also part of one of the most controversial trades in PBA history involving Rafi Reavis, Rudy Hatfield, Aries Dimaunahan, and Ervin Sotto.

On June 11, 2010, he was traded to the Air21 Express for Mike Cortez but then returned to Ginebra for a future pick.

On April 6, 2015, Mamaril was traded by Ginebra to the GlobalPort Batang Pier for Dave Marcelo after Frankie Lim was hired by Barangay Ginebra as the team's head coach. Marcelo played college basketball for San Beda Red Lions, where he played under coach Lim. The trade was a part of a 4-team trade that also involved Ginebra's sister team, San Miguel and Barako Bull.

In October 2022, it was reported that Mamaril has retired from professional basketball to pursue becoming a nurse.

PBA career statistics

As of the end of 2020 season

Season-by-season averages

|-
| align="left" | 
| align="left" | Purefoods
| 36 || 22.6 || .511 || .000 || .525 || 4.8 || .6 || .4 || .6 || 6.1
|-
| align="left" | 
| align="left" | Shell
| 73 || 30.3 || .386 || .000 || .515 || 6.0 || 1.8 || .9 || 1.4 || 9.0
|-
| align="left" | 
| align="left" | Coca-Cola
| 38 || 24.3 || .363 || .000 || .576 || 5.1 || 1.0 || .5 || 1.2 || 7.6
|-
| align="left" | 
| align="left" | Barangay Ginebra
| 52 || 16.2 || .449 || .000 || .586 || 3.6 || .6 || .2 || .4 || 5.2
|-
| align="left" | 
| align="left" | Barangay Ginebra
| 48 || 20.3 || .422 || .000 || .625 || 4.0 || .8 || .3 || .7 || 5.6
|-
| align="left" | 
| align="left" | Barangay Ginebra
| 41 || 18.3 || .484 || .000 || .632 || 3.9 || .5 || .4 || .7 || 6.4
|-
| align="left" | 
| align="left" | Barangay Ginebra / Air21
| 32 || 17.0 || .479 || .000 || .471 || 4.8 || .7 || .4 || .6 || 5.3
|-
| align="left" | 
| align="left" | Barangay Ginebra
| 38 || 14.0 || .444 || .000 || .444 || 3.1 || .8 || .4 || .5 || 3.8
|-
| align="left" | 
| align="left" | Barangay Ginebra
| 31 || 13.3 || .427 || .000 || .565 || 3.2 || .7 || .5 || .3 || 2.9
|-
| align="left" | 
| align="left" | Barangay Ginebra
| 46 || 17.7 || .467 || .000 || .549 || 4.4 || .5 || .5 || .6 || 5.5
|-
| align="left" | 
| align="left" | Barangay Ginebra
| 34 || 9.6 || .385 || .000 || .531 || 1.9 || .4 || .1 || .2 || 2.3
|-
| align="left" | 
| align="left" | Barangay Ginebra / GlobalPort
| 32 || 15.8 || .433 || .000 || .488 || 3.8 || .8 || .2 || 1.0 || 4.1
|-
| align="left" | 
| align="left" | GlobalPort
| 38 || 19.0 || .470 || .000 || .667 || 4.2 || 1.1 || .6 || .8 || 5.1
|-
| align="left" | 
| align="left" | GlobalPort
| 34 || 15.7 || .343 || .000 || .429 || 2.8 || .6 || .4 || .5 || 2.5
|-
| align="left" | 
| align="left" | San Miguel
| 25 || 4.7 || .440 || .000 || .571 || .8 || .2 || .0 || .1 || 1.0
|-
| align="left" | 
| align="left" | San Miguel
| 10 || 4.1 || .143 || .000 || .000 || .6 || .1 || .0 || .2 || .2
|-
| align="left" | 
| align="left" | San Miguel
| 10 || 9.3 || .222 || .000 || .671 || 2.3 || .1 || .0 || .4 || 1.6
|-class=sortbottom
| align="center" colspan=2 | Career
| 618 || 18.1 || .424 || .000 || .553 || 3.9 || .8 || .4 || .7 || 5.1

References

External links
 Player Profile at PBA-Online!

1980 births
Living people
Bakersfield Renegades men's basketball players
Barako Bull Energy players
Barangay Ginebra San Miguel players
Basketball players from Bulacan
Centers (basketball)
Filipino men's basketball players
Magnolia Hotshots draft picks
Magnolia Hotshots players
NorthPort Batang Pier players
Power forwards (basketball)
Powerade Tigers players
San Miguel Beermen players
Shell Turbo Chargers players
Filipino emigrants to the United States
American men's basketball players